The 1978–79 season was Paris Saint-Germain's 9th season in existence. PSG mainly played their home league games at the Parc des Princes in Paris, but twice at the Stade Bauer in Saint-Ouen-sur-Seine as well, registering an average attendance of 18,550 spectators per match. The club was presided by Francis Borelli. The team was coached by player-manager Jean-Michel Larqué until August 1978. Pierre Alonzo took over as manager until November 1978, when he was replaced by Velibor Vasović. Mustapha Dahleb began the campaign as team captain, but Vasović gave the armband to Dominique Bathenay in February 1979.

Summary

In spite of a disappointing first season, the club gave Jean-Michel Larqué a vote of confidence in 1978–79, signing France national team mainstays Dominique Baratelli and Dominique Bathenay with the hope that PSG would finally get closer to the top of the league table. But the campaign was once again a failure. In August, following a catastrophic start to the season, Larqué stepped down to focus on his playing role at the club.

Pierre Alonzo took over until early November 1978, when he surprisingly resigned. His replacement, Velibor Vasović, had not yet arrived and PSG visited Monaco for a league match on November 4th. Club president Francis Borelli named the starting lineup that day. This is the only time that PSG have played an official game without a manager on the bench. Paris lost 1–2. Carlos Bianchi managed a second consecutive Division 1 top scorer title, before switching 13th-placed Paris for French champions Strasbourg. François M'Pelé also left the club with an impressive goal tally of 97, including a club record 28 strikes in the French Cup.

Players 

As of the 1978–79 season.

Squad

Out on loan

Transfers 

As of the 1978–79 season.

Arrivals

Departures

Kits 

French radio RTL was the shirt sponsor. French sportswear brand Le Coq Sportif was the kit manufacturer.

Friendly tournaments

Tournoi de Paris

Competitions

Overview

Division 1

League table

Results by round

Matches

Coupe de France

Round of 64

Round of 32

Statistics 

As of the 1978–79 season.

Appearances and goals 

|-
!colspan="16" style="background:#dcdcdc; text-align:center"|Goalkeepers

|-
!colspan="16" style="background:#dcdcdc; text-align:center"|Defenders

|-
!colspan="16" style="background:#dcdcdc; text-align:center"|Midfielders

|-
!colspan="16" style="background:#dcdcdc; text-align:center"|Forwards

|-

References

External links 

Official websites
 PSG.FR - Site officiel du Paris Saint-Germain
 Paris Saint-Germain - Ligue 1 
 Paris Saint-Germain - UEFA.com

Paris Saint-Germain F.C. seasons
Association football clubs 1978–79 season
French football clubs 1978–79 season